Oneirophobia (from Greek όνειρο (oneiro), meaning "dream", and φόβος (phobos), meaning "fear") is the fear of dreams. It is discussed in The Dream Frontier, a book by Mark Blechner, a neuro-psychoanalyst at the William Alanson White Institute.

The fear involves suffering due to experiences with frightening dreams (nightmares and/or night terrors) or by negative events in the life affecting those dreams. Some sufferers try to avoid sleep or falling asleep altogether. Those with post-traumatic stress disorder (PTSD), for instance, often re-experience their trauma in nightmares, so frequently that they attempt to avoid these painful symptoms through alcohol or other drugs. Sleep itself is feared for its capacity to bring on the repressed trauma.

However, not all oneirophobia is strictly a function of post-traumatic stress disorder, as most dream content, and thus the fear of its manifestation, is related to the daily functions of the unconscious. In traditional Freudian thought, the dreamer channels their thoughts, feelings, desires and fears through dreams, but in a disguised and nonrational way. When these dreams are recalled and experienced as disturbing events- especially if they are of frequent recurrence- the dreamer may begin to develop anxiety over the expression of their unconscious. Many sufferers may also be frightened by the unusual or surreal nature of dreams.

See also
List of phobias

References

Phobias